Parasyuk or Parasiuk (Ukrainian or Russian: Парасюк) is a gender-neutral Ukrainian surname. It may refer to
Ostap Parasyuk (1921–2007), Ukrainian theoretical physicist
Bogoliubov–Parasyuk theorem
Volodymyr Parasyuk (born 1987), Ukrainian MP and public figure
Wilson Parasiuk (born 1943), Canadian entrepreneur and politician

Ukrainian-language surnames